Hilgard Peak is the tallest mountain in the Madison Range in the U.S. state of Montana. The summit is located in a remote section of the Lee Metcalf Wilderness within the Beaverhead-Deerlodge National Forest. The peak was first climbed in 1948. The peak was named for E. W. Hilgard, a geology professor who served on the Hayden Expedition during its exploration of the Yellowstone area.

References

External links

Mountains of Madison County, Montana
Mountains of Montana